Kirinyaga Central Constituency, formerly known as Kerugoya/Kutus Constituency is an electoral constituency in Kenya. It is one of four constituencies in Kirinyaga County. The constituency was established for the 1997 elections.

Members of Parliament

Wards

References 

Constituencies in Kirinyaga County
Constituencies in Central Province (Kenya)
1997 establishments in Kenya
Constituencies established in 1997